Pecado Rasgado (English: Ripped Sin) is a Brazilian telenovela produced and broadcast by TV Globo. It premiered on 4 September 1978 and ended on 16 March 1979, with a total of 167 episodes. It's the twenty second "novela das sete" to be aired at the timeslot. It is created by Silvio de Abreu and directed by Régis Cardoso.

Cast

References

External links 
 

1978 telenovelas
TV Globo telenovelas
Brazilian telenovelas
1978 Brazilian television series debuts
1979 Brazilian television series endings
Portuguese-language telenovelas